Wilkes Community College (WCC) is a public community college in Wilkesboro, North Carolina. It is part of the North Carolina Community College System and serves the people of Wilkes, Ashe and Alleghany counties, and beyond. The college is best known as the site of the annual MerleFest music festival.

The college has a  campus and 14 buildings. The student enrollment is typically around 3,500 students for curriculum, 900 for continuing education, and 1,600 for basic skills. It also has satellite campuses in nearby Ashe and Alleghany counties. WCC is accredited by the Southern Association of Colleges and Schools.

History
Wilkes Community College was founded in October 1964 by the North Carolina Board of Education. The first Board of Trustees was sworn into office on January 15, 1965, and classes were first held in August 1965. The student enrollment for the college's first year was 68. The college's campus originally covered 75 acres and included three buildings - Thompson, Hayes and Lovette halls.

The first president of WCC was Dr. Howard Thompson, who served from March 5, 1965, to June 30, 1977. He was followed by Dr. David E. Daniel, July 1, 1977 to April 2, 1989; Dr. H. Edwin Beam, interim president, April 3, 1989 to July 16, 1989; Dr. James R. Randolph, July 17, 1989 to July 7, 1995; Dr. Swanson Richards, interim president, July 8, 1995 to February 29, 1996; Dr. Gordon G. Burns, Jr., March 3, 1996 to June 1, 2014; Morgan Francis, acting president, June 2, 2014 to June 30, 2014; and Dr. Jeffrey Alan Cox, the college’s current president who assumed duties on July 1, 2014.

MerleFest
In 1988 legendary, Grammy-winning guitarist Doc Watson, WCC horticulture instructor B Townes, and local businessman and musician Bill Young started the MerleFest music festival on the campus of Wilkes Community College. Named in honor of Doc's late son Merle Watson, MerleFest has grown into one of the largest bluegrass and folk music festivals in the United States, drawing nearly 80,000 music fans each year. The festival has become the primary fundraiser for Wilkes Community College, and has brought national publicity to the college.

References

External links
 

Two-year colleges in the United States
Vocational education in the United States
North Carolina Community College System colleges
Educational institutions established in 1964
Universities and colleges accredited by the Southern Association of Colleges and Schools
Education in Wilkes County, North Carolina
Buildings and structures in Wilkes County, North Carolina
1964 establishments in North Carolina
NJCAA athletics